The 2021–22 Azerbaijan Premier League was the 30th season of the Azerbaijan Premier League, the highest tier football league of Azerbaijan. The season began on 14 August 2021 and finished on 22 May 2022.

Teams
On 6 April 2022, the Azerbaijan Premier League approved the name change of Keşla FK to Shamakhi FK.

Stadia and locations
''Note: Table lists in alphabetical order.

Stadiums

Personnel and kits

Note: Flags indicate national team as has been defined under FIFA eligibility rules. Players and Managers may hold more than one non-FIFA nationality.

Managerial changes

Foreign players
Each team can use only six foreign players on the field in each game.

In bold: Players that capped for their national team.

League table

Fixtures and results
Clubs played each other four times for a total of 28 matches each.

Matches 1–14

Matches 15–28

Season statistics

Top scorers

Hat-tricks

Clean sheets

See also
 Azerbaijan Premier League
 Azerbaijan First Division
 Azerbaijan Cup

References

External links
UEFA

2021–22 in European association football leagues
2021-22
1